Eudunda is a rural town in South Australia, roughly 103 kilometres northeast of Adelaide, established in 1870 after settlers began moving into the area in the 1860s. As of the 2006 census, Eudunda had a population of 640.

Eudunda is in the Regional Council of Goyder local government area, the South Australian House of Assembly electoral district of Stuart and the Australian House of Representatives Division of Grey.

Etymology and Nomenclature 
The town name of Eudunda originates from the name of the spring to the west of the town, which local Aboriginal people called judandakawi. According to Dr. Phillip Clarke of the South Australian Museum, judandakawi means 'sheltered water.' Alternative translations appear as Eudundacowi, Eudandakawi, or Eudundacowie. The spring still flows to this day. Some local theories suggest that German pronunciation of the letter j led to the current pronunciation.

The earliest-known written mention of the name 'Eudunda' comes from the Adelaide newspaper, The Express and Telegraph, from 8 March 1872, where a small notice appears regarding the conveyance of mail.

Weigall Street in Eudunda is named after Sir Archibald Weigall, Governor of South Australia, who visited Eudunda in December 1920 to lay the foundation stone of the hospital. Hannan Street is named in honour of John Hannan, who once owned the land on which the town is now situated. Bruce Street may be named after Talbot Baines Bruce, a talented Adelaide solicitor in the 1850s and 60s, who purchased large swathes of land in the Hundred of Neales as early as 1867.

Barwell Street may take its name from Sir Henry Newman Barwell (1877-1959), a one-term Premier of South Australia. Likewise, Gunn Street may take its name from another South Australian Premier, John Gunn (1884-1959).

History
The earliest European activity in the district was overlanding, centred on Narcoota and the Narcoota Track in the late 1830s.  Pastoralism soon followed, with expansive 'runs' being taken up for sheep grazing by men such as Lachlan McBean, Frederick Hansborough Dutton, and William Russell.  Several decades then passed before closer settlement began.

In March 1838, four young men in their twenties, John Hill (c.1810-1860), William Wood (1813-1885), Charles Willis (1815-1886), and John Oakden (1818-1884), all being livestock importers from the eastern colonies, formed an exploration party in Adelaide. Their intention was to be the first to bring livestock overland from New South Wales to South Australia, following the Murray River, for which purpose they sought to find a viable route through the Mount Lofty Ranges between the Murray River and Adelaide. Travelling on horseback with packhorses, after leaving Adelaide they first traversed the Barossa Valley, finding and naming Cockatoo Valley, before continuing northeast past Nuriootpa to near Eudunda. Their expedition took them through the scrub to the east of Eudunda, where Sutherlands, Bower and Mount Mary lay, on their trek to Morgan and back.

In the late 1860s, Henry Watson, a Quaker, established a wine store and bar on the site of the Eudunda Hotel Motel, serving passing stockmen. The founder of Eudunda was John Henry Hannan, who owned the land that was surveyed and divided for sale.

In 1874, Friedrich Gotthilf Ernst Appelt opened Appelt's General Store on South Terrace, Eudunda. It was the first trading general store in the town. The building is listed on the South Australian Heritage Register.

Railway services were first introduced to Eudunda in 1878, with the opening of the North-West Bend Railway to Morgan. The line was opened by the Governor of South Australia, Sir William Francis Drummond Jervois, on 18 October 1878.

In 1878 the District Council of Neales was formed, with the town becoming the centre of the local government area. The District Council lasted until 1932 when it merged with the District Council of Julia to form the District Council of Eudunda. This lasted until 1997 when the Regional Council of Goyder was formed.

Wiesner and Hilbig, founded in 1884 by Johannes Gottlieb Wiesner and Gustav Adolph Hilbig, were one of the founders of Eudunda's rich manufacturing history. Wiesner and Hilbig had five forges in the 1880s and cast plough and scarifier shares as well as casings for strippers. Wiesner and Hilbig received a First Order of Merit for their stripper at the 1887 Adelaide Jubilee International Exhibition and a Second Order of Merit for their stump-jump plough and stump-jump scarifier. The business was taken on by Carl and Heinrich Lutz in 1895. With a team of up to 35 men on-site, the Lutz brothers were famed for their manufacturing of strippers; they were regularly sold to New South Wales and Victoria - one farmer on South Australia's West Coast even had 22 Lutz strippers. In 1905, Theodor and Georg Jansen took over the business from the Lutz brothers, soon expanding the business. In 1907 they submitted a patent for "An improved plough share and means for attaching it to the plough foot." As cars arrived in the Eudunda area, they expanded into the service of motor vehicles. In 1951, Johannes and Leslie Reimann purchase the Jansen Brothers business, renaming it J.B. Reimann and Son Holdings. The business continues today, after a twelve-year gap, as Reimann Manufacturing.

In 1895, a meeting of farmers and other interested parties was held at Mann's Hotel (The Eudunda Hotel) to discuss the sale of firewood, predominantly from the Murray Flats around Sutherlands, Bower and Mount Mary, to Adelaide. This was the foundation of the state-wide store franchise, Eudunda Farmer's Co-Operative Society, which later formed Eudunda Farmers.

Eudunda's strong German culture led to a series of events during the First World War that were stoked by anti-German sentiments. A local Lutheran pastor was arrested in early 1915 for having communicated with the then Attorney-General of South Australia, Hermann Homburg, regarding matters of naturalization. Although released shortly thereafter, a further incident occurred on 12 February 1915. Citizen's Forces raided homes and businesses of German-born and Australian-born residents. Sentries were posted outside the town stopping travellers in and out. Although the raiders discovered nothing, the raid was also served to demonstrate that authorities were determined to suppress any disloyal feelings.

On 16 November 1920, world-renowned author, Colin Thiele, was born at Mutter Knabe's Nursing Home in Eudunda. His upbringing in nearby Julia, and his two-year education in Eudunda, served as great inspiration for many of his writings.

In 1950, Laucke Flour Mills acquired the prominent grain-mill building on Gunn Street, which had previously been owned by Edwin Davey.

Media 
The Eudunda Courier and Murray Flats Advertiser was first printed in Eudunda on the 9 February 1922, by Mr. H. J. Weckert. Ownership changed in 1928 when F. T. Marsden bought the newspaper, and again in 1948 when N. W. and V. H. Baehnisch acquired it. In 1978, due to the death of V. H. Baehnisch, the newspaper closed, but after negotiation, the newspaper was taken over by the Reese and Smedley family. In 1981, the partnership changed hands, with Barossa News taking ownership. The Eudunda Courier then became a supplement to the Barossa Herald. Since then, the title has been dropped, with Eudunda news items now being covered by The Leader.

The town today 
The town landscape has changed a little from the Edwardian era – with the "Gunn Street Extension" pushing the main road from the Top Pub on Gunn Street straight through what used to be railway land toward Bruce Street and the centre of the town. The new road has further enhanced the town gardens, seen on the drive into the main centre.

Eudunda was the birthplace of world-renowned author Colin Thiele, whose bronzed sculpture (by Chris Radford) is in the Centenary Gardens. The gardens also contain stone walls and tiled art featuring a Century of Transport.

The town's distinctive German-Lutheran heritage continues with St. John's Lutheran Church and St. John's Lutheran Primary School. Many residents have German ancestry and carry Germanic surnames.

Reimann Manufacturing continues a long tradition of manufacturing in Eudunda. Reimann Manufacturing is a world-leader in the production of turnkey pipework. They have worked on projects including the Regency to Pym Pipeline, the Kangaroo Creek Dam Upgrade and the Northern Adelaide Irrigation Scheme, as well as Snowy Hydro 2.0.

In September 2021, artwork was completed on the Eudunda Silos, in the former railway station precinct. The 30-metre-tall mural was painted by artist, Sam Brooks, who said the mural, "tells a story about two children, sharing stories about their past and their culture. These two children use these local books as a way to teach each other about their history, culture and connections to the area." The mural reflects the town's rich agricultural heritage, with references to Eudunda's Ngadjuri heritage, author Colin Thiele, the Eudunda Farmer's Co-Operative Society, Laucke's Mill, and more.

Transport

Eudunda was once a station on the Morgan railway line from 1878 until it closed. From 1914, it was the junction station for a branch running north past Point Pass to Robertstown. It is on the Thiele Highway, and is the junction to the Worlds End Highway leading north through Robertstown towards Burra and state route B84 (Curio Road) leading west through Auburn and Balaklava to Port Wakefield.

Narcoota
Narcoota and associated Narcoota Springs, lie in a valleyin the south of the Eudunda locality near Neales Flat. The area featured prominently in the pioneering history of South Australia.

Located at Section 350, Hundred of Dutton, South Australia, Narcoota Springs are at the eastern escarpment of the Mount Lofty Ranges, 12 kilometers south of Eudunda, in a valley on Narcoota Creek, adjacent to the later named Smith Road.

Narcoota, an indigenous name for the area, is of obscure meaning.  It may be a corruption of 'Narcoona' – seeing – in reference to being a lookout over the Murray Plains. European settlers adopted it from the outset, although it was variously spelt at first (examples are Nancoota, Tharcoota, and Nicota).

Narcoota Springs was a bustling stopover and watering place for the earliest explorers and pioneering overlanders, being a rare source of permanent water at the brink of the waterless Murray Plains.  It was at the western end of the Narcoota Track, which from 1838 to 1842 was part of the main (and first) road between the Murray River and Adelaide.  At the eastern end was The Pound, 9 km north of Blanchetown, which years later became named McBean Pound at Roonka Station.  The overland road diverged at the Pound – one track went south toward Mount Barker and the other west to Narcoota, then on to Gawler Town and Adelaide.

Apart from overlanding parties droving large mobs of livestock from New South Wales, Narcoota Springs had some distinguished visitors in its heyday.  They included Governor George Gawler and explorer Charles Sturt, as well as Henry Inman, Commander of Police, who passed through there at least five times.The first was in 1839 when Inman led a police party to the Weston Flat district to investigate conflict resulting in the death of one over-lander and an unknown number of Aboriginals.  Months later he was back again when he took part in the exploration expedition of Governor Gawler from North West Bend to Mount Bryan.

In 1841 Inman was there again after his own over-landing party was attacked near Chowilla, losing 5,000 sheep.  He again camped there as part of the 68-man police party led by Commissioner of Police Thomas Shuldham O'Halloran, sent by Governor George Grey to protect other over-landers at the Rufus River.

After a settlement was established in late 1841 by Edward John Eyre at Moorundie (8 km below Blanchetown, South Australia), the overland route then shifted further south, roughly following the present Sturt Highway between Blanchetown and Truro. The Narcoota Track became disused thereafter.

Later in the 1840s a pastoral property named Narcoota Station was established.  Nearby is Mount Rufus, where gold was discovered in 1868, but without much result.  With closer settlement in the latter part of the 1800s, many grain farmers moved into the district, such that by 1900 there were busy schools and churches.  Over a century later many stone ruins attest to the failure of close settlement, but those pioneering foundations produced the farms and grazing properties which thrive there

today.

Geologically, the beds outcropping along Narcoota Creek are so typical in structure and stratigraphy of geological features occurring in several locations throughout the North Mount Lofty Ranges, that the name Narcoota Series has been adopted for the entire group.

Gallery

References

External links

eudunda.net – Eudunda & Region of Southern Goyder's Web Portal
Eudunda Community, Business and Tourism Committee
The Eudunda Family Heritage Gallery
Eudunda's 150th Anniversary

Towns in South Australia
Geology of South Australia